Xəzərli is a village in the municipality of Uzunoba in the Khachmaz Rayon of Azerbaijan.

References

Populated places in Khachmaz District